Al-Qufa'ah is a Yemeni sub-district in the Shar'ab as-Salam District in Taiz Governorate. Al-Qufa'ah had a population of 5,969 according to the 2004 census.

Villages 
al-'Sa'adah village. 
al-Aizfar village.
al-Shajaruh village.
al-Hamri village.
al-Mahalu village.
al-Saqadiu village.
al-Jibal village.

References

Sub-districts in Shar'ab as-Salam District